Coal Miner's Daughter is a 1980 American biographical musical film directed by Michael Apted from a screenplay written by Tom Rickman. It follows the story of country music singer Loretta Lynn from her early teen years in a poor family and getting married at 15 to her rise as one of the most influential country musicians. Based on Lynn's 1976 biography of the same name by George Vecsey, the film stars Sissy Spacek as Lynn. Tommy Lee Jones, Beverly D'Angelo and Levon Helm are featured in supporting roles. Ernest Tubb, Roy Acuff, and Minnie Pearl make cameo appearances as themselves.

A film on Lynn's life was intended to be made since the release of the biography. Production for the film began in March 1979, and Lynn herself chose Spacek to portray her on screen after seeing a photograph of her, despite being unfamiliar with her films. The film's soundtrack featured all Lynn's hit singles, which were all sung by Spacek, as well as Patsy Cline's "Sweet Dreams" sung by D'Angelo. The soundtrack reached the top 40 on the Billboard 200 chart and was certified gold by the Recording Industry Association of America.

Universal Pictures released Coal Miner's Daughter theatrically on March 7, 1980. The critical consensus on Rotten Tomatoes calls it "a solidly affecting story."  The film grossed $67.18 million in North America against a budget of $15 million, becoming the seventh highest-grossing film of 1980. The film received seven nominations at the 53rd Academy Awards, including for Best Picture, with Spacek winning Best Actress. At the 38th Golden Globe Awards, it garnered four nominations and won two; Best Motion Picture – Musical or Comedy and Best Actress  (for Spacek).

The film is considered "culturally, historically or aesthetically significant" by the Library of Congress and was selected to be preserved in the United States National Film Registry in 2019.

Plot
In 1945, 13-year-old Loretta Webb is one of eight children of Ted Webb, a Van Lear coal miner raising a family with his wife in the midst of grinding poverty in Butcher Hollow, Kentucky (pronounced by locals as "Butcher Holler").

In 1948, at the age of 15, Loretta marries 22-year-old Oliver "Mooney" (aka Doo, short for Doolittle) Lynn, becoming a mother of four by the time she is 19. The family moves to northern Washington State, where Doo works in the forest industry and Loretta sings occasionally at local honky-tonks on weekends. After some time, Loretta makes an occasional appearance on local radio.

By the time Loretta turns 25, Norm Burley, the owner of Zero Records, a small Canadian record label, hears Loretta sing during one of her early radio appearances. Burley gives the couple the money needed to travel to Los Angeles to cut a demo tape from which her first single, "I'm a Honky Tonk Girl," is made. After returning home from the sessions, Doo suggests he and Loretta go on a promotional tour to push the record. Doo shoots his own publicity photo for Loretta, and spends many late nights writing letters to show promoters and to radio disc jockeys all over the South. After Loretta receives an emergency phone call from her mother telling her that her father had died, she and Doo hit the road with records, photos, and their children. The two embark on an extensive promotional tour of radio stations across the South.

En route, and unbeknownst to the couple, Loretta's first single, "I'm a Honky Tonk Girl," hits the charts based on radio and jukebox plays, and earns her a spot on the Grand Ole Opry. In the summer of 1961, after 17 straight weekly performances on the Opry, she is invited to sing at Ernest Tubb Record Shop's Midnite Jamboree after her performance that night. Country superstar Patsy Cline, one of Loretta's idols, who had recently been hospitalized from a near-fatal car wreck, inspires Loretta to dedicate Patsy's newest hit "I Fall to Pieces" to the singer herself as a musical get-well card. Cline listens to the broadcast that night from her hospital room and sends her husband Charlie Dick to Ernest Tubb Record Shop to fetch Loretta so the two can meet. A close friendship with Cline follows, which abruptly was ended by Cline's death in a plane crash on March 5, 1963.

The next few years are a whirlwind. The stress of extensive touring, keeping up her image, overwork, and trying to keep her marriage and family together cause Loretta a nervous breakdown, which she suffers onstage at the beginning of a concert. After a year off at her ranch in Hurricane Mills, Tennessee, Loretta goes back on the road, returning to establish herself as the "First Lady of Country Music."

The film closes with Loretta recounting the story of her life through her 1970 hit song "Coal Miner's Daughter" to a sold-out audience.

Cast

Production
Lynn personally chose Spacek to portray her, making the decision based on a photograph of the actress despite being unfamiliar with her films, a story Spacek recounts in a DVD audio commentary for the collector's edition of the film. Initially, Spacek was reluctant to participate, and asked to do her own singing in the film in hopes of scaring the studio from pursuing her for the role. At the time that Lynn prematurely announced on The Tonight Show Starring Johnny Carson that "Sissy Spacek is going to play me," the actress was torn between friends who advised her to do Lynn's film and those who advised her to choose instead a Nicolas Roeg project due to start filming at the same time. Talking it over with her mother-in-law that evening, Spacek was advised to pray for a sign, which she did. She and her husband subsequently went for a drive in his mother's car, where the radio was tuned to a classical music station that changed formats at sunset every evening. As the couple pulled out of the parking garage, the title line of the song "Coal Miner's Daughter" came from the radio.

In her 2012 memoir My Extraordinary Ordinary Life, Sissy Spacek states that she became fast friends with Loretta Lynn and worked to emulate her unique accent and speech patterns by spending an afternoon tape-recording the singer while she told stories of her life, some of which made it into the script. She then listened to the tapes and repeated the lines until she captured her own version of Lynn. Though Spacek had started out as a singer, the producers considered dubbing Loretta's vocals over her performance. Lynn encouraged them to allow Spacek to do all of her own singing in the film and helped the actress learn to sing and play guitar in her style. The film's soundtrack featured Spacek's singing all of Lynn's hits sung in the movie, including "Coal Miner's Daughter."

The locations included Blackey, Eolia, Flatgap, Bottom Fork, Redfox in Knott and Letcher Counties in Kentucky; and Pardee, a former coal camp on the Virginia side of Black Mountain. Interiors of Lynn's childhood home were shot in a warehouse in Norton, Virginia. Scenes were also shot in Loretta Lynn's Madison, Tennessee, home on Barbara Drive.

The replica of Lynn's home in Butcher Hollow, built at Bottom Fork, Letcher County, Kentucky, was burned by arsonists. It was on the front porch of that house that Levon Helm, drummer and singer of the rock group The Band, made his acting debut as Lynn's father.

In an interview with Merv Griffin broadcast on November 7, 1978, Loretta Lynn said that Harrison Ford had been originally cast.

Historical inaccuracies 
There are some events depicted in the film that are contrary to actual facts:

Patsy Cline never owned a tour bus, although she had thought about purchasing one shortly before her death.

Cline's plane crash did not occur early in the morning as the DJ on the radio in Lynn's bedroom stated; it happened shortly after 6:00 in the evening. 

"You Ain't Woman Enough (To Take My Man)" was not inspired by one of Mooney's cheating episodes, which was caught by Lynn while touring with Cline, as the film suggests. The song was inspired by a fan of Lynn, whom she met backstage. The fan told Lynn how another woman stole her husband, to which Lynn replied, "Why she ain't woman enough to take your man," instantly giving Lynn an idea for a song title. Also, the film portrayed Lynn singing the song to Cline while writing it; the song was not recorded until late 1965, nearly three years after Cline's death; so it was likely that Lynn didn't write the song (and met the fan who inspired it) until after Cline's death as well.

Soundtrack

Coal Miner's Daughter: Original Motion Picture Soundtrack was released on March 7, 1980, under the MCA Nashville label. It included music by Beverly D'Angelo, Levon Helm, and Sissy Spacek except for the "End Credits Medley" and material by other artists that were not under contract to MCA.
The album was certified Gold by the RIAA on January 11, 1982 and has been released on vinyl, cassette tape, and CD. Levon Helm's "Blue Moon of Kentucky" was released as a single on 7-inch vinyl, both as a double-A-side and also with Allen Toussaint's "Working in the Coal Mine," a non-album track also sung by Helm, on the B-side. The soundtrack would win Country Music Association Award for Album of the Year in 1980, the first of only two soundtracks to do so. (O Brother, Where Art Thou? would be the other in 2001.)

Charts and certifications

Weekly charts

Year-end Charts

Certifications

Reception

Box office
In its opening weekend in the United States and Canada, Coal Miner's Daughter was number 1 at the box office, grossing $3.6 million in 796 theaters. The film grossed a total of $67.1 million in the United States and Canada, becoming the seventh highest-grossing film of 1980 in North America.

Critical response

On review aggregator Rotten Tomatoes, Coal Miner's Daughter holds an approval rating of 85% based on 62 reviews, with an average rating of 8.1/10. The website's critical consensus reads: "Like a classic traditional country song, Coal Miner's Daughter draws on time-tested formula -- and undeniable talent -- to tell a solidly affecting story."  On Metacritic, which assigns a rating to reviews, the film has a weighted average score of 87 out of 100, based on 47 critics, indicating "universal acclaim."

Variety called it "a thoughtful, endearing film charting the life of singer Loretta Lynn from the depths of poverty in rural Kentucky to her eventual rise to the title of 'queen of country music.'" Roger Ebert from The Chicago Times stated that the film "has been made with great taste and style; it's more intelligent and observant than movie biographies of singing stars used to be."

Awards and nominations

The film is recognized by American Film Institute in these lists:
 2004: AFI's 100 Years...100 Songs:
 "Coal Miner's Daughter" – Nominated
 2006: AFI's 100 Years...100 Cheers – #70

Home media
 This film was released on LaserDisc on two separate releases. The first release was in May 1980, and the extended play version was released in July 1981. These releases were both made by MCA DiscoVision.
 The film was released in the VHS format in the 1980s by MCA Home Video and on March 1, 1992, by MCA/Universal Home Video.
 On September 13, 2005, Universal released a 25th Anniversary Edition on DVD in widescreen (1.85:1) format and featuring the music tracks remixed to 5.1 Dolby Digital stereo, leaving the dialogue and effects tracks as they were on the original mono soundtrack from 1980.
 That same DVD was included in a four-pack DVD set that also included Smokey and the Bandit, The Best Little Whorehouse in Texas, and Fried Green Tomatoes.
 On January 7, 2014, Universal Pictures released the film on Blu-ray.

Broadway adaptation
On May 10, 2012, at the Grand Ole Opry, Lynn announced that Zooey Deschanel was to portray her in a Broadway musical adaptation.

One episode of The Simpsons, titled "Colonel Homer," is based partly on this film. The episode also stars Beverly D'Angelo as cocktail waitress Lurleen Lumpkin.

References

External links

 
 
 
 
 

1980 films
1980 drama films
1980s musical drama films
American biographical films
American musical drama films
Biographical films about musicians
Biographical films about singers
Country music films
Films based on biographies
Autobiographies adapted into films
Films set in Kentucky
Films shot in Kentucky
Films shot in Virginia
Musical films based on actual events
Films set in mining communities
Loretta Lynn
Universal Pictures films
Best Musical or Comedy Picture Golden Globe winners
Films featuring a Best Actress Academy Award-winning performance
Films featuring a Best Musical or Comedy Actress Golden Globe winning performance
Films directed by Michael Apted
Cultural depictions of American women
Cultural depictions of country musicians
Cultural depictions of Patsy Cline
United States National Film Registry films
1980s English-language films
1980s American films
Works about alcoholism